Javier Hernández Balcázar (born 1 June 1988), commonly known by the nickname Chicharito (Mexican Spanish: little pea), is a Mexican professional footballer who plays as a striker for Major League Soccer club LA Galaxy. He is known for his clinical finishing along with his pace and technical ability and is widely considered to be amongst the greatest Mexican players of all time.

Hernández began his senior club career at age 18 in 2006, playing for Guadalajara, where he won the Primera División. In 2010, Hernández signed for Manchester United, becoming the club's first Mexican player. During his five years with United, he amassed over 150 appearances and scored 59 goals, winning two Premier League titles and reached the 2011 UEFA Champions League Final, as well as setting the then record for the fifth-best minutes-per-goal ratio (130.2) in league history. Hernández departed the club on loan to Real Madrid in 2014, and in 2015 he joined Bayer Leverkusen on a permanent deal. Two years later, Hernández returned to England and signed for West Ham United. In 2019, he signed for Sevilla before joining LA Galaxy the following year.

A Mexican international, Hernández is the country's all-time leading goalscorer. He made his debut for the national team in September 2009 in a friendly match against Colombia. He has represented Mexico at the 2010 FIFA World Cup, the 2011 CONCACAF Gold Cup, the 2013 FIFA Confederations Cup, the 2014 FIFA World Cup, the Copa América Centenario, the 2017 FIFA Confederations Cup and the 2018 FIFA World Cup. He was the 2011 Gold Cup's top scorer with seven goals and was named the most valuable player of the tournament.

Early life
Hernández was born in Guadalajara, Jalisco and first played in a recreation league when he was seven years old. Hernández lived in Morelia, Michoacán for over four years while his father, footballer Javier "Chícharo" Hernández, played for Monarcas Morelia. While living in Morelia, Hernández attended elementary school at the Instituto Piaget where he studied from third to sixth grade and played for the school's football team.

At the age of nine, Hernández joined C.D. Guadalajara and signed his first professional contract when he was 15. He was set to play in the 2005 FIFA U-17 World Championship, but an injury sidelined him from the team that ultimately won the championship. Whilst playing football professionally, Hernández was also taking business administration classes at Universidad del Valle de Atemajac. Hernández has held both Hugo Sánchez and Rafael Márquez as his football idols growing up.

Club career

C.D. Guadalajara
Hernández began playing with C.D. Guadalajara's lower-division team, "Chivas" Coras in Tepic, Nayarit in the 2005–06 season. He made his debut for Guadalajara in the 2006 Apertura in a win over Club Necaxa at Estadio Jalisco. With the score at 3–0, Hernández came on as a substitute for Omar Bravo in the 82nd minute, before scoring the fourth goal of the game five minutes later. It was his only goal in seven appearances in 2006–07. He made a further six appearances in 2007–08 without scoring.

Hernández made 10 appearances in the 2008 Apertura without scoring, but he scored four goals in 15 appearances in the 2009 Clausura. In the 2009 Apertura, Hernández finished as the joint-third top scorer, with 11 goals in 17 appearances. He started the 2010 Torneo Bicentenario with eight goals in five games. He finished as a joint-leader in the goalscoring chart for the 2010 Torneo Bicentenario, with 10 goals in 11 games despite missing five matches due to injury. He also won the tournament's best forward award.

Manchester United

Transfer

Manchester United were first made aware of Hernández in October 2009; a scout went to Mexico that December and reported positively after watching a few games. Because of Hernández's age, the club originally planned to wait before making a move to sign him, but his potential involvement with the national team at the World Cup rushed the club into making a bid. United's chief scout, Jim Lawlor, was sent to Mexico for three weeks in February and March to watch Hernández and filed another positive report on him, before the club solicitor went over to Mexico to finalise the paperwork.

On 8 April 2010, Hernández agreed a deal to sign for Manchester United for an undisclosed fee, subject to a work permit application. The previous day, Hernández had been present at Manchester United's Champions League quarter-final win over Bayern Munich at Old Trafford. The deal was conducted in complete secrecy; Hernández's agent was kept in the dark, as was his grandfather Tomás Balcázar, who thought Hernández was going on a trip to Atlanta in the United States. As part of the deal, United played a friendly against C.D. Guadalajara to open the Mexican club's new stadium on 30 July. On 27 May, the work permit was granted, allowing the transfer to be made official on 1 July.

2010–11: Premier League title and European final

Hernández made his United debut on 28 July, coming on as a 63rd-minute substitute for Nani in the 2010 MLS All-Star Game at the NRG Stadium, Houston; he scored his first goal for the club 18 minutes later, lobbing the ball over Nick Rimando from just outside the area after a long through-ball from Darren Fletcher. Two days later, Hernández scored against Manchester United while playing in a friendly for his former club, C.D. Guadalajara, scoring the inaugural goal at their recently constructed stadium; he started the game in a Chivas jersey and scored the first goal after just eight minutes. He switched sides at half-time, but he was unable to prevent a 3–2 defeat for Manchester United. He scored for the third pre-season game in a row as he netted in a 7–1 victory over a League of Ireland XI at the newly built Aviva Stadium on 4 August.

Hernández made his competitive debut on 8 August and scored his first goal in the process, netting United's second of a 3–1 victory over Chelsea in the 2010 FA Community Shield. He came on at the start of the second half and got on the end of a pass from Antonio Valencia before the Mexican's shot deflected off his own face and into the net. On 16 August, Hernández made his Premier League debut as he replaced Wayne Rooney in the 63rd minute of their 3–0 home victory over Newcastle United. He scored his first Champions League goal on 29 September, coming off the bench to score the only goal in an away win over Valencia. He scored his first league goal for United in a 2–2 home draw against West Bromwich Albion on 16 October. Eight days later he scored his first brace for the club, also his first away league goals, in a 2–1 away win over Stoke City. Two days on from this display, he came off the bench to score a last-minute winner, his first ever League Cup goal, in a 3–2 win over Wolves which sent them through to the quarter-finals where they were then knocked out by West Ham United. On 1 January 2011, he came off the bench to head the winning goal in a 2–1 away win over West Bromwich Albion. Hernández became the top scoring Mexican in Premier League history after opening the scoring in a 2–1 home victory over Stoke City on 4 January.

On 25 January, Hernández scored the equalising goal of a 3–2 comeback away win over Blackpool. Four days later he scored his first FA Cup goal as he netted the winner in a 2–1 away victory over Southampton. Hernández netted twice in a 4–0 away win over Wigan on 26 February. Eight days later, he netted a late consolation goal in a 3–1 derby defeat away to Liverpool. Hernández netted twice in a 2–1 home win over Marseille on 15 March, sending United through to the quarter-finals of the Champions League. On 2 April, he scored the final goal against West Ham United as they came from two goals down to claim a 4–2 away win. On 8 April, Hernández was revealed as a contender for the PFA Young Player of the Year award alongside teammate Nani. Four days later, he opened the scoring in the 2–1 quarter-final win over Chelsea in the Champions League, with the game ending 3–1 on aggregate, sending United through to the semi-finals. He continued his goal scoring form on 23 April scoring the winning goal with a header in the 1–0 home win over Everton.

On 8 May, Hernández scored the opening goal in a 2–1 home win over Chelsea after just 36 seconds to leave United one point away from winning the title. The goal against Chelsea made him the first player since Ruud van Nistelrooy in the 2001–02 season to score 20 goals for the club in his debut season. Hernández capped his debut season with Manchester United by winning the Sir Matt Busby Player of the Year award on 18 May which was voted for by the fans. On 28 May, Hernández played all 90 minutes in the 3–1 defeat to Barcelona in the Champions League Final. On 5 July 2011, the International Federation of Football History and Statistics named Hernández as the "World Goalgetter 2011", with 13 goals, ahead of other players such as Cristiano Ronaldo, Giuseppe Rossi, and Lionel Messi.

2011–12: Injury hit season
After participating in the 2011 CONCACAF Gold Cup with Mexico, Hernández returned to Manchester United to begin pre-season training in New York ahead of the 2011 MLS All-Star Game. On 26 July 2011, he was taken to the hospital after suffering a minor concussion after he was hit on the head with a ball during a training session; he was cleared the next day, but did not take part in the game.

On 28 July 2011, it was reported that Rafael Ortega, the doctor at C.D. Guadalajara, informed Manchester United that Hernández was suffering from a pre-existing neurological condition. Ortega also explained that Hernández had suffered from "acute migraines and "headaches" as a teenager. He did not participate in any of United's pre-season matches, nor the 2011 FA Community Shield. He also missed United's opening game of the season against West Bromwich Albion.

Hernández made his first appearance in the 2011–12 season on 22 August in a 3–0 win against Tottenham Hotspur, coming off the bench for Danny Welbeck in the 79th minute. He returned to the starting lineup on 10 September against Bolton Wanderers, scoring twice in a 5–0 victory. On 15 October 2011, Hernández came off the substitutes bench to net a crucial equaliser against Liverpool at Anfield in a 1–1 draw. In the 81st minute Hernández gambled on Danny Welbeck's flick on from a corner to steal in and head the equaliser.

Hernández signed a new five-year contract on 24 October to tie him to Manchester United until 2016. The following day it was reported that Hernández made the longlist for that year's FIFA Ballon d'Or. Hernández scored his fourth league goal of the season and the winner against Everton at Goodison Park, in a 1–0 victory on 29 October. He then scored his fifth league goal of the season and the winner in United's next away game at Swansea City, a 1–0 win. Hernández scored again in the following game at home to Newcastle United, when Wayne Rooney's shot was blocked by a defender and ricocheted back off Hernández and into the net. He was then carried off the pitch early in United's next league game away at Aston Villa, appearing to go over on his ankle without a challenge from an opponent. After the match, manager Sir Alex Ferguson said Hernández had suffered ankle ligament damage and would be out for up to four weeks. On 18 December, Hernández made a surprise early return against Queens Park Rangers. He came on as a 63rd-minute substitute for Danny Welbeck in United's 2–0 victory at Loftus Road.

On 31 January 2012, Hernández scored his first goal since November, and his seventh goal of the season in a 2–0 league win at Old Trafford against Stoke City, scoring the first of two penalties. Hernández continued his scoring form on 5 February at Stamford Bridge against Chelsea, scoring the third goal of a three-goal comeback draw, heading in a cross from Ryan Giggs. On 16 February, Hernández scored his first goal in the Europa League, in a 2–0 away win against Ajax in the round of 32. He scored again in the second leg at Old Trafford on 23 February, but this time in a 2–1 home defeat. However, United still won the tie 3–2 on aggregate. On 18 March, Hernández scored twice in a 5–0 win over Wolverhampton Wanderers.

2012–13: Second Premier League title

Hernández began his third season with United on 2 September 2012, coming on as a 72nd-minute substitute for Danny Welbeck in a 3–2 win against Southampton. On 15 September, he was named in the starting eleven for the match against Wigan Athletic, playing all 90 minutes. Despite having a penalty saved in the fifth minute by Wigan goalkeeper Ali Al-Habsi, Hernández scored his first goal of the season, as well as assisting in teammate Nick Powell's goal in a 4–0 victory. On 23 October, Hernández netted a brace in a 3–2 comeback win against Braga in a Champions League group stage match after United had gone down 2–0 in the first half. Five days later, he scored the winner against nine-man Chelsea in a controversial 3–2 win after he was deemed to have been in an offside position when scoring the goal.

On 10 November 2012, Hernández came on as a second-half substitute and scored two goals as United came from 2–0 down to beat Aston Villa 2–3 at Villa Park. At the end of the match, Hernández claimed the hat-trick, but replays showed that his shot for United's second goal was hit wide until turned into his own net by Villa defender Ron Vlaar. On 24 November, he scored his fifth league goal of the season in a 3–1 home win over Queens Park Rangers. On 26 December, Hernández scored United's fourth goal in the final minutes in a 4–3 win over Newcastle United at Old Trafford. He then began 2013 by scoring a brace against Wigan on 1 January, helping United to a 4–0 victory. On 26 January, Hernández would go on to score another brace, this time during an FA Cup match against Fulham which United won 4–1.

In another FA Cup match against Reading on 18 February, Hernández scored in the 72nd minute, giving United a 2–0 lead. His goal would end up being a deciding factor as United went on to win the game 2–1. Although he started in United's 2–0 Premier League victory against QPR on 23 February 2013, he did not score in the match and he didn't score again until 10 March in another FA Cup match against Chelsea which ended in a 2–2 draw. Hernández opened the scoring in manager Sir Alex Ferguson's final home game at Old Trafford against Swansea City. After a free kick was not cleared, he slotted in from six yards in the first half to put United 1–0 up, in a game they went on to win 2–1. Hernández scored United's last goal of the season and the final goal of the Ferguson era, when he tapped in a cross from close range in a 5–5 draw away at West Bromwich Albion on the final day.

2013–15: Lack of playing time and departure
Hernández scored his first goal of the season under new manager David Moyes on 25 September 2013, netting the only goal of a home win over rivals Liverpool in the third round of the League Cup. On 26 October, with his first league goal of the campaign, he headed the winner as they came from behind to defeat Stoke 3–2 at Old Trafford. Three days later, he recorded a brace – starting with a penalty – in a 4–0 win against Norwich City in the next round of the League Cup. In the tournament's semi-finals, his goal from Adnan Januzaj's cross in the last minute of extra time forced a penalty shootout, which United lost to Sunderland.

On 29 August 2015, it was reported that Manchester United manager Louis van Gaal had told Hernández he could leave the club before the closure of the transfer window. Although with one year of his contract still remaining, it was unclear with scale of transfer fee United would demand for him.

Hernández played in what proved to be his final match for Manchester United on 22 August in a scoreless draw against Newcastle United at Old Trafford. He came on as a substitute in the 67th minute, replacing Adnan Januzaj. As he often came on as a substitute during his time with Manchester United, Hernández's minutes per goal ratio is among the most prolific in the history of the Premier League.

Loan to Real Madrid
On 1 September 2014, Hernández signed for Real Madrid on a season-long loan deal, with an option of a purchase at the end of the loan. He underwent a medical and signed the contract that same day.

He made his debut in the Madrid derby on 13 September, replacing Karim Benzema for the final 27 minutes as the team lost 2–1 at home to Atlético Madrid. On 19 September, Hernández came on as a 77th-minute substitute for Gareth Bale and scored his first two goals in an 8–2 away win against Deportivo de La Coruña.

He scored the winning goal on 22 April 2015 in the 1–0 win over Atlético Madrid, which sent Real Madrid into the semi-finals of the Champions League. Four days later, Hernández scored a brace in Madrid's 2–4 away win over Celta de Vigo.

On 26 May, it was announced that Hernández would return to Manchester United following the end of his loan spell after Real Madrid decided not to make the loan move a permanent deal.

Bayer Leverkusen
On 31 August 2015, it was announced Hernández signed a three-year contract with Bundesliga club Bayer Leverkusen for an undisclosed fee, reportedly £7.3 million.

2015–17: Successive seasons as club top scorer
Hernández made his Bundesliga debut as a 58th-minute substitute in the 1–0 defeat to Darmstadt 98 on 12 September. Four days later he scored his first goal in the Champions League group-stage match against BATE Borisov, scoring the third goal in the 4–1 victory. On 23 September, Hernández scored his first Bundesliga goal in Bayer's 1–0 victory over FSV Mainz, being also named Man of the Match. On 20 October, Hernández scored his first brace for Leverkusen in their 4–4 draw against Roma in the Champions League. He ended the Champions League group stage with five goals from six matches but Bayer failed to qualify for the knockout phase, finishing third in Group E and dropping into the Europa League.

Hernández was named Bundesliga Player of the Month for November; a month in which he scored in a 2–1 loss at home to 1. FC Köln and twice in 3–1 win at Eintracht Frankfurt. On 12 December, Hernández scored his first hat-trick in Leverkusen's 5–0 win over Borussia Mönchengladbach, thus scoring 15 goals in his last 12 matches, and taking his tally to 17 goals in 20 matches. He would again be named Bundesliga Player of the Month for December.

On 30 January 2016, in Bayer's second match after the winter break, Hernández scored twice in a 3–0 defeat of Hannover 96 to register his 20th and 21st goals of the season. Two days later, he was named for the third time Bundesliga Player of the Month.

Hernández scored and provided an assist in Leverkusen's 2–1 win over SC Hauenstein in the first round of the DFB-Pokal on 21 August 2016. Two days later, it was reported that Hernández would miss Bayer's opening match of the season against Borussia Mönchengladbach after sustaining a broken hand. On 17 September, Hernández scored his first goal of the Bundesliga season at Eintracht Frankfurt, however he missed a chance to equalise late from the penalty spot in the 2–1 loss. The following week at FSV Mainz 05, Hernández collected a perfect hat-trick that included a stoppage time winner, the third hat trick of the Bundesliga season. He was later named Bundesliga Player of the Month for September.

On 28 January 2017, Hernández scored Bayer Leverkusen's second goal in the 2–3 loss to Borussia Mönchengladbach, ending his eleven-match scoreless streak. On 21 February, following the match against Atlético Madrid, Hernández became the Mexican player with the most appearances in the Champions League with 47, surpassing Rafael Márquez's previous record of 46 appearances.

West Ham United

2017–20: Record transfer and sustained injuries
On 24 July 2017, Hernández joined English club West Ham United for an undisclosed fee, reported to be around £16 million, signing a three-year contract. He was given the number 17 jersey. He made his debut for the West Ham on 13 August, playing all 90 minutes in the 4–0 defeat against his former club Manchester United at Old Trafford. The following week, Hernández scored his first two goals for West Ham in the 3–2 loss to Southampton.

In November, Hernández sustained a hamstring injury while on international duty with Mexico, and it was reported that he would be ruled out from activity for up to two weeks. Following the sacking of Slaven Bilić and the appointment of David Moyes as manager, there were fears Hernández would be excluded at West Ham as he was at Manchester United. In response, Moyes referred to him as a "top goalscorer," and "a brilliant finisher." During the winter transfer window there were reports Hernández would exit the club after only six months, being linked with a move to Turkish club Beşiktaş as well as a possible return to Manchester United. On 20 January 2018, he came off the bench to score the equalising goal for West Ham in their 1–1 league draw against AFC Bournemouth, scoring his first goal since October. Following the match Moyes praised Hernández's performance, saying "we needed him today." On 8 April, in a league match against Chelsea, he scored a 73rd-minute goal to make the score 1–1, marking the ninth time he had scored against the club.

On 28 August 2018, Hernández scored West Ham's third goal in injury time of a 3–1 victory over AFC Wimbledon in the second round of the EFL Cup. In September, West Ham manager Manuel Pellegrini declared that Hernández was suffering from glandular fever, causing him to miss out various matches. He would recover and return to training in October. On 3 November, he scored his first Premier League goal of the season in West Ham's 4–2 victory over Burnley.

On 22 February 2019, Hernández scored the equalising goal in West Ham's eventual 3–1 win over Fulham; on initial viewing, it looked like he had headed the ball in from a yard to score, however replays of the goal appeared to show the ball rebound off of Hernández's arm to put the ball into the net. It was also his 50th career Premier League goal, becoming the first Mexican to reach the milestone. He would get on the scoresheet again on 16 March, coming on as a second-half substitute and scoring twice—including the stoppage-time winner—to secure a 4–3 league victory over Huddersfield.

Prior to the start of the season, he was given the number 9 shirt. Hernández scored his first goal of the 2019–20 Premier League season on 17 August 2019 as West Ham drew 1–1 with Brighton at Falmer Stadium. On 30 August, Hernández handed in a transfer request to West Ham and flew to Spain to complete a medical ahead of a proposed €8 million move to Sevilla.

Sevilla
On 2 September 2019, Hernández joined La Liga club Sevilla for an undisclosed fee, reported to be  £7.3m, signing a three-year contract. He made his league debut on 15 September in an away match against Alavés, coming on as a 70th-minute substitute in Sevilla's 1–0 win. Four days later, in a Europa League group stage match against  Azerbaijani side Qarabağ FK, Hernández scored a free kick, the first in his career, in his side's 3–0 victory. On 27 October, he scored his first goal in La Liga with Sevilla in a 2–0 victory against Getafe.

LA Galaxy
On 21 January 2020, Hernández signed a three-year contract with Major League Soccer club LA Galaxy, and became the highest paid player in the league. He made his MLS debut on 29 February in a 1–1 draw against Houston Dynamo, captaining the team and playing the entirety of the match. On 13 July he scored his first goal for the club against Portland Timbers which ended in a 2–1 loss.

In the first game of his second season, playing against Inter Miami, he scored twice for a 3–2 victory. The following matchweek, he scored a hat-trick against New York Red Bulls for another 3–2 victory.

International career

Youth
Hernández was one of the 21 players called up to the under-20 side for the 2007 FIFA U-20 World Cup in Canada. He came on as a late substitute in the opening game against Gambia and scored the final goal in Mexico's 3–0 victory.

Senior

On 30 September 2009, Hernández made his senior national team debut against Colombia, where he made an assist in a 2–1 loss. On 24 February 2010, Hernández scored two goals against Bolivia and had an assist for Braulio Luna's goal. On 3 March, Hernández scored a header against New Zealand, giving Mexico the lead in a 2–0 victory. On 17 March, Hernández scored his fourth international goal to give Mexico a 2–1 victory over North Korea. On 26 May, he scored a consolation header against the Netherlands in a 2–1 loss. On 30 May, Hernández scored yet again, netting twice in a 5–1 victory over Gambia.

2010 FIFA World Cup
On 11 June, Hernández made his FIFA World Cup debut during the opening game of the 2010 tournament against South Africa in a 1–1 draw, coming on in the 73rd minute to replace Guillermo Franco. On 17 June, Hernández again came off the bench and this time scored his first ever World Cup goal, netting the first in a 2–0 victory over France by springing the offside trap, latching onto a through ball from Rafael Márquez, sidestepping Hugo Lloris and sidefooting into the net. By scoring he emulated his grandfather, Tomás Balcázar, who scored against France in the 1954 World Cup. He was elected as man of the match. It was also the 2,100th goal scored in all World Cup tournaments. On 27 June, Hernández made his first start at a World Cup and netted his second goal of the World Cup, by turning Martín Demichelis on the edge of the box before sending a left-foot shot into the roof of the net, in Mexico's 3–1 loss against Argentina in the round of 16. FIFA's statistical analysis showed that Hernández was the quickest player in World Cup 2010, reaching a top speed of 32.15 km/h.

Post World Cup friendlies
Hernández scored another goal in his first match for Mexico since the World Cup, in a friendly against world champions Spain on 11 August 2010. He scored after just 12 minutes of the match, but David Silva equalised for Spain in the last minute of play to claim a 1–1 draw. Hernández scored his and Mexico's first international goal of 2011 as he opened the scoring in a 2–0 win over Bosnia and Herzegovina on 9 February. On 26 March, Hernández scored two goals in an international friendly against Paraguay. He first connected with a pass from Pablo Barrera in the sixth minute of the match, before scoring off a low cross in the 29th minute, three minutes after teammate Andrés Guardado had made the score 2–0. He exited to a standing ovation in the 65th minute.

2011 CONCACAF Gold Cup
On 5 June 2011, he scored a hat-trick, the first in his career, in a 5–0 win against El Salvador.
On 9 June 2011, he scored two goals, in the 36th and 76th minutes against Cuba.
On 18 June 2011, Hernández scored the winner in a 2–1 win over Guatemala to send Mexico to the semi-finals. On 22 June 2011, he helped Mexico reach the Gold Cup Final after a 2–0 win over Honduras in extra-time, where he scored Mexico's second goal in the 99th minute. Hernández was the Gold Cup's top scorer with seven goals and was named the most valuable player of the tournament, in addition to helping his team to a 4–2 victory in the Final against the United States.

2013 FIFA Confederations Cup
Hernández was selected in Mexico's squad for the 2013 FIFA Confederations Cup. On 16 June, he scored via penalty kick in the team's opening match, a 2–1 defeat to Italy at the Estádio do Maracanã. In the final group match, Hernández scored both goals as El Tri defeated Japan 2–1.

2014 FIFA World Cup
Hernández scored five times for Mexico during qualification for the 2014 FIFA World Cup. On 23 June, Hernández scored Mexico's third goal against Croatia in their 3–1 victory at Arena Pernambuco to qualify the team for the round of 16.

2015 CONCACAF Cup
On 1 July 2015, Hernández sustained a broken collar bone during a friendly match against Honduras, ruling him out of the 2015 CONCACAF Gold Cup, which Mexico went on to win.

In October 2015, Hernández was called up for the CONCACAF Cup – a play-off match to determine CONCACAF's entry into the 2017 FIFA Confederations Cup – against the United States. Mexico defeated the U.S. 3–2 after extra time at the Rose Bowl, with Hernández opening the score after ten minutes.

2016–2018: Copa América Centenario and milestones
Hernández was included in Mexico's 23-man squad that would participate in the Copa América Centenario tournament. On 5 June 2016, he played 83 minutes in the 3–1 victory over Uruguay, and scored the first goal in Mexico's 2–0 win over Jamaica. The goal took Hernández's tally to 45, one goal shy of tying Jared Borgetti's national team record.

On 12 May 2017, Hernández was included in the national squad that would play in the FIFA Confederations Cup in Russia. On 27 May, Hernández became Mexico's all-time top goalscorer with 47 goals when he scored in a friendly against Croatia. In Mexico's Confederations Cup debut, he scored Mexico's first goal in an eventual 2–2 draw against Portugal on 18 June, scoring a low header from a Carlos Vela cross.

On 27 March 2018, Hernández earned his 100th cap in a friendly match against Croatia.

2018 FIFA World Cup

Hernández scored three times for Mexico during qualification for the 2018 FIFA World Cup. He was in the starting lineup in Mexico's first World Cup game against Germany at the Luzhniki Stadium in Moscow and made an assist to Hirving Lozano to go on to win the match 1–0. In the second group game Hernández scored Mexico's second goal, his 50th international goal, in their 2–1 win over South Korea, and was named FIFA Man of the Match. With his goal, Hernández became the joint-highest scoring Mexican player at the World Cup with four goals, tied with Luis Hernández, and the third Mexican player to score in three World Cups. He went on to start in the final group stage match against Sweden, as well as in the round-of-16 loss to Brazil.

Style of play
A clinical goalscorer, Hernández has been described as a "goal-poacher", due to a number of his goals being scored from close-range. His movement off the ball, pace, and ability to find space inside the box has also been praised. He has been described as one of the few players who seem capable of appearing behind a defender's back to knock in the ball from two yards, with his playing style being compared to that of German striker Miroslav Klose.

Rudi Völler, sporting director of Bayer Leverkusen, has praised Hernández for his keen positioning in front of goal, saying: "he certainly doesn't win every tackle but he has an incredible sense of where the ball will end up". Former Manchester United manager Sir Alex Ferguson described Hernández as two-footed, very quick, in possession of a good spring, and a natural goalscorer. Ferguson also said Hernández's style reminds him of former United striker Ole Gunnar Solskjær – the so-called "baby-faced assassin" who scored the injury time winner against Bayern Munich in United's 1999 Champions League triumph. Hernández's former teammate Jesús Padilla described him as "amazing in the air" despite his height.
Due to his small stature, he is extremely quick and agile, also possessing good technique.

In a May 2016 interview with Sports Illustrated, Hernández commented on his abilities inside the penalty area, describing the intuition he has in knowing where an impending cross will fall from a teammate and outsmarting opposing defenders. Former Mexico national team coach Juan Carlos Osorio described Hernández as having "a knack for the goal. Sometimes it seems like every rebound or every deflection goes into his path. Another thing is he doesn't dwell on a missed opportunity. He always looks forward to the next one. He has good ability in the air. He has good pace, and he makes those diagonal runs starting from the first defender in behind the second one. He also has the willingness to work defensively."

Esports career
On 20 April 2022, Hernández signed with Complexity Gaming to play Call of Duty.

Personal life

Hernández is the son of Javier Hernández Gutiérrez, who played for three clubs in Mexico and was a member of the Mexico squad at the 1986 FIFA World Cup. Hernández Gutiérrez quit his job as manager of Guadalajara's reserve side in order to watch Hernández play in the 2010 World Cup in South Africa. Hernández is also the grandson of Tomás Balcázar, who also played for Guadalajara and played for the national side in the 1954 FIFA World Cup.

On 26 May 2012, Hernández became the Mexican ambassador for UNICEF, making him the third Mexican to serve this position, following César Costa and Julieta Venegas in 2004 and 2009 respectively. As ambassador, he will participate in a number of activities to encourage children and teenagers to not abandon their education. He was commemorated in a news conference, where he said he felt "proud and committed".

Hernández is a devout Roman Catholic. He is well known for his pre-game ritual where he gets on his knees and prays which he performs before most games. On 27 June 2013, EA Sports announced that they had featured Hernández on the North American cover of FIFA 14, alongside global cover star Lionel Messi.

In January 2019, Hernández and his ex-wife Sarah Kohan, an Australian model of Romanian descent and travel blogger, announced on Instagram that they were expecting their first child. On 16 June 2019, their son, Noah, was born. One year later on 5 October 2020, their daughter, Nala, was born.

Nickname
Hernández is commonly known as Chicharito, meaning little pea in Spanish, and wears the name on his shirt. This is due to his father, Javier Hernández Gutiérrez, being nicknamed Chícharo (pea) because of his green eyes.

Career statistics

Club

International

Honours
Guadalajara
Mexican Primera División: Apertura 2006

Manchester United
Premier League: 2010–11, 2012–13
FA Community Shield: 2010
UEFA Champions League runner-up: 2010–11

Real Madrid
FIFA Club World Cup: 2014

Sevilla
UEFA Europa League: 2019–20

Mexico
CONCACAF Gold Cup: 2011
CONCACAF Cup: 2015

Individual
Mexican Primera División  Forward of the Season: Bicentenario 2010
Liga MX Golden Boot (Shared): Bicentenario 2010
Sir Matt Busby Player of the Year: 2010–11
Bundesliga Idol: 2015
Bundesliga Team of the Season: 2015–16
Bundesliga Player of the Month: November 2015, December 2015, January 2016, September 2016, February 2017
MLS All-Star: 2022
MLS Player of the Month: April/May 2021
CONCACAF Men's Player of the Year: 2015
CONCACAF Best XI: 2015
CONCACAF Gold Cup Golden Boot: 2011
CONCACAF Gold Cup MVP: 2011
IFFHS World Goalgetter: 2011
IFFHS Most Popular Player of the CONCACAF: 2011
IFFHS CONCACAF Men's Team of the Decade: 2011–2020

See also
 List of top international men's football goalscorers by country
 List of men's footballers with 100 or more international caps
 List of men's footballers with 50 or more international goals

References

External links

Profile at StretfordEnd.co.uk (Official Manchester United statistics website)
Profile at RealMadrid.com

1988 births
Living people
Footballers from Guadalajara, Jalisco
Mexican Roman Catholics
Mexican footballers
Association football forwards
C.D. Guadalajara footballers
Manchester United F.C. players
Real Madrid CF players
Bayer 04 Leverkusen players
West Ham United F.C. players
Sevilla FC players
LA Galaxy players
Liga MX players
Premier League players
La Liga players
Bundesliga players
Major League Soccer players
Designated Players (MLS)
Mexico youth international footballers
Mexico under-20 international footballers
Mexico international footballers
2010 FIFA World Cup players
2011 CONCACAF Gold Cup players
2013 FIFA Confederations Cup players
2014 FIFA World Cup players
Copa América Centenario players
2017 FIFA Confederations Cup players
2018 FIFA World Cup players
CONCACAF Gold Cup-winning players
FIFA Century Club
Mexican expatriate footballers
Mexican expatriate sportspeople in England
Mexican expatriate sportspeople in Spain
Mexican expatriate sportspeople in Germany
Mexican expatriate sportspeople in the United States
Expatriate footballers in England
Expatriate footballers in Spain
Expatriate footballers in Germany
Expatriate soccer players in the United States
Articles containing video clips
UEFA Europa League winning players